Alejandro Montoya Vera (born 3 May 1952) is a Cuban boxer. He competed in the men's middleweight event at the 1972 Summer Olympics. He lost in the quarter-finals of the tournament to Marvin Johnson of the United States, after defeating Alec Nastac and Bill Knight in previous rounds.

References

External links
 

1952 births
Living people
Cuban male boxers
Olympic boxers of Cuba
Boxers at the 1972 Summer Olympics
Boxers at the 1975 Pan American Games
Pan American Games medalists in boxing
Pan American Games gold medalists for Cuba
Place of birth missing (living people)
Middleweight boxers
Medalists at the 1975 Pan American Games
20th-century Cuban people